Schild's Ladder is a 2002 science fiction novel by Australian author Greg Egan.  The book derives its name from Schild's ladder, a construction in differential geometry, devised by the mathematician and physicist Alfred Schild.

Plot summary
Twenty-thousand years in the future, Cass, a humanoid physicist from Earth, travels to an orbital station in the vicinity of the star Mimosa, and begins a series of experiments to test the extremities of the fictitious Sarumpaet rules – a set of fundamental equations in "Quantum Graph Theory", which holds that physical existence is a manifestation of complex constructions of mathematical graphs. However, the experiments unexpectedly create a bubble of something more stable than ordinary vacuum, dubbed "novo-vacuum", that expands outward at half the speed of light as ordinary vacuum collapses to this new state at the border, hinting at more general laws beyond the Sarumpaet rules. The local population is forced to flee to ever more distant star systems to escape the steadily approaching border, but since the expansion never slows, it is just a matter of time before the novo-vacuum encompasses any given region within the Local Group.

Two factions develop as the expanding bubble swallows star after star: the Preservationists, who wish to stop the expansion and preserve the Milky Way at any cost; and the Yielders, who consider the novo-vacuum to be too important a discovery to destroy without understanding.

Six hundred years after the initial experiment, a vessel called the Rindler has matched velocities with an ever-expanding novo-vacuum region at the border, powered by multispectral light emitted as the ordinary vacuum collapses into its lower energy-state. A variety of refugees are probing the novo-vacuum in order to understand the physics that makes it possible. The novo-vacuum turns out to be more complicated than anyone suspects, however, and Egan's usual topics of simulation and quantum ontology are taken to the extreme when we learn that a whole ordered universe exists within this zone of apparent chaos, existing as direct elaborations of the quantum graph's lattice structure, of which elementary particles, fundamental interactions, and our spacetime itself are only special cases.

It is ultimately revealed that the novo-vacuum's exotic geometry contains living organisms and even civilizations.  This ecosystem is based on "vendeks," microbe-like complexes of quantum graph structures only 10−33 meters across.  Agglomerations of vendeks form "xennobes," analogous to multicellular organisms but only 10−27 meters across.  This discovery greatly increases the importance of the Yielders' mission, since destroying the novo-vacuum would be tantamount to genocide, and a solution must be found to the metastability of the novo-vacuum's border region within our spacetime.

See also

Quantum graph

External links
 Official Website

2002 Australian novels
Transhumanist books
Novels by Greg Egan
Australian science fiction novels
2002 science fiction novels
Novels about mathematics
Hard science fiction
Victor Gollancz Ltd books